Washington Township is one of the sixteen townships of Belmont County, Ohio, United States. The 2010 census found 517 people in the township.

Geography
Located in the southern part of the county, it borders the following townships:
Smith Township - north
Mead Township - northeast
York Township - east
Switzerland Township, Monroe County - southeast
Sunsbury Township, Monroe County - southwest
Wayne Township - west

No municipalities are located in Washington Township, although the unincorporated community of Alledonia lies in the township's center.

Name and history
Washington Township was organized about 1831.

It is one of forty-three Washington Townships statewide.

Government
The township is governed by a three-member board of trustees, who are elected in November of odd-numbered years to a four-year term beginning on the following January 1. Two are elected in the year after the presidential election and one is elected in the year before it. There is also an elected township fiscal officer, who serves a four-year term beginning on April 1 of the year after the election, which is held in November of the year before the presidential election. Vacancies in the fiscal officership or on the board of trustees are filled by the remaining trustees.

References

External links
County website

Townships in Belmont County, Ohio
Townships in Ohio
1831 establishments in Ohio
Populated places established in 1831